Russula xanthoporphyrea is a mushroom in the family Russulaceae native to North America.

See also
''List of Russula species

References

External links

xanthoporphyrea
Fungi of North America
Fungi described in 1997